Kaman 22 (UAV) is an Iranian wide-body unmanned combat aerial vehicle (UCAV) unveiled on the 24th of February, 2021 by the Islamic republic of Iran Air Force. It is said to be the country's first wide-body drone.

According to IRIAF commander Aziz Nasirzadeh, the Kaman 22 is the first domestically-manufactured wide-body combat drone in the country capable of carrying all kinds of munition.

See also 
 Aerospace Force of the Islamic Revolutionary Guard Corps
 Armed Forces of the Islamic Republic of Iran
 Defense industry of Iran
 Meraj (UAV)

References 

 

 

Unmanned military aircraft of Iran
Iranian military aircraft
Aircraft manufactured in Iran
Islamic Republic of Iran Air Force
Post–Cold War military equipment of Iran
Unmanned aerial vehicles of Iran